The Manager of Opposition Business in the Senate is the member of the Australian Official Opposition Shadow Ministry responsible for negotiating with the Manager of Government Business in the Senate regarding proceedings in the Australian Senate. Among other things, the topics of negotiation are the order in which Government bills and other items of business are taken, the time allotted for debate, and the timing of Opposition business.

The current Manager of Opposition Business is Anne Ruston.

List

See also
 Manager of Opposition Business in the House (Australia)
 Manager of Government Business in the Senate
 Leader of the Opposition in the Senate (Australia)

References

Lists of political office-holders in Australia
Politics of Australia
Opposition of Australia